Molini may refer to:

Places  
Croatia
Molini Franceschi (or Zmijavci), contrada in the municipality of the Split-Dalmatia County in Croatia

Italy
Molini, fraction of the municipality of Fraconalto in the Province of Alessandria
Molini di Colognola, municipality of Casazza in the Province of Bergamo
Selva dei Molini, comune (municipality) in South Tyrol
Molini de Tures, village in the municipality of Sand in Taufers in South Tyrol
Molini di Triora, comune (municipality) in the Province of Imperia

People with the surname 
Martín Molini (born 1995), Argentine footballer

See also 
Mola (disambiguation)
Molina (disambiguation)
Molino (disambiguation)
Molyneux (disambiguation)